Hope for Haiti Now is a live album by various artists to benefit Hope for Haiti Now's campaign to alleviate the 2010 Haiti earthquake. All benefits from the album sales go to Haiti relief organizations, including the Red Cross and Wyclef Jean's Yele Haiti foundation. Hope for Haiti Now features 19 live performances from the television broadcast Hope for Haiti Now: A Global Benefit for Earthquake Relief as well as the studio version of "Stranded (Haiti Mon Amour)", an original track performed by Jay-Z, Bono, The Edge and Rihanna during the telethon.

The digital-only album was made available for pre-order through iTunes on January 22, 2010. It set a record as the biggest one-day album pre-order in iTunes history.
The album sold 171,000 copies in its first weekend, and, in merely two days, became the first digital-only album to top the Billboard 200 album chart.

The album has since also become available at Amazon and Rhapsody.

Track listing

Chart performance
Hope for Haiti Now debuted on the Billboard 200 at number 1, selling 171,000 copies in only two days as Nielsen SoundScan's sales tracking week at the time ended at the close of business each Sunday, thus becoming the first digital-exclusive set to top the tally in Billboard's history. It also became the second independently distributed album to reach the number one spot on the Billboard 200 chart that year (and 13th overall) following Vampire Weekend's Contra.

Charts

Weekly charts

Year-end charts

See also
 Humanitarian response to the 2010 Haiti earthquake

References

External links
 Hope for Haiti Now website

Charity albums
2010 Haiti earthquake relief
Albums produced by Swizz Beatz
2010 live albums
2010 compilation albums
Various artists albums